Obscure Records was a U.K. record label which existed from 1975 to 1978.  It was created and curated by Brian Eno.  Ten albums were issued in the series.  Most have detailed liner notes on their back covers, analyzing the compositions and providing a biography of the composer, in a format typical of classical music albums, and much of the material can be regarded as 20th-century classical music.  The label provided a venue for experimental music.

Discography

Obscure Records

Releases and editions
The first seven albums were issued on the Obscure label in 1975 and 1976, manufactured and distributed in the UK by Island Records whose name appeared at the bottom of the label.  These have a catalogue number expressed as "Obscure no. 1" through 7 on the covers, or "OBSCURE-1" etc. on the labels.  All albums use the original, mostly black, cover art.

External links
 Brian Eno discography with detailed notes on editions
 UbuWeb Sound: Obscure Records (1975–78)  http://www.ubuweb.com/sound/obscure.html

Classical music record labels
Record labels established in 1975